Hot Damn! is a 1997 blues album by Billy Lee Riley. The album was nominated for a Grammy.

Track listing
All tracks composed by Billy Lee Riley; except where indicated
 "Fine Little Mamma" – 2:10
 "Winter Time Blues" –  	4:36
 "I'm Him" (Jerry West) – 3:14
 "It Never Rains Till It Rains On You" (J. Kennedy) – 4:04
 "Nothin' But The Devil" (West) – 3:58
 "I'm Gonna Quit You Pretty Baby" (Silas Hogan, West) – 1:59
 "Rock Me Baby" (B.B. King) – 4:41
 "Take Me Back Baby" –  	3:36
 "Rainy Night In Georgia" (Tony Joe White) – 4:58
 "Too Close Blues" (West) – 2:17
 "Rainin' in My Heart" (James Moore, Jerry West) – 3:03
 "Cause You Got a Little Money" (J. Kennedy) – 2:07
 "Blues for My Baby" – 4:55
 "How Come We All Ain't Got The Same" – 6:54
 "You Gonna Miss Me" – 3:36
 "Time Ain't On My Side" – 4:27

Personnel

Musicians
 Billy Lee Riley – vocals, harmonica, rhythm guitar
 James Lott – lead guitar, rhythm guitar
 Ray Sanders – acoustic bass
 Pete Sully – drums

Technical
 Billy Lee Riley – producer
 James Lott – engineer
 John Neil Martin - 2nd audio engineer
 Diane Painter – art direction
 Craig Allen – design
 Bill Friskies-Warren – liner notes

References

External links
 Mike Greenblatt: Meet Billy Lee Riley, the rockabilly rebel who was both a lover and a fighter.
 Hot Damn!
 Bob Townsend: Billy Lee Riley Hot Damn! (Capricorn).
 Thom Owens: Billy Lee Riley: Hot Damn
 Billy Lee Riley – Hot Damn!

1997 albums
Capricorn Records albums